Elegia fallax is a moth of the  family Pyralidae. It is known from Spain, Portugal, France, Italy, Croatia, the Czech Republic, Slovenia, Hungary, Romania, Bulgaria, North Macedonia and Greece. It has also been recorded from the Channel Islands in 2005.

The wingspan is 17–19 mm.

The larvae feed on Quercus (oak) species.

References

Moths described in 1881
Phycitini
Moths of Europe
Moths of Asia